Mary Parker (born 1930) is notable for being the first woman to appear on Melbourne television.

She was one of three persons to host HSV Channel 7's test broadcasts prior to their official opening night; the other two test broadscasters being Eric Pearce (later Sir Eric Pearce) and Danny Webb. On HSV-7's opening night, 4 November 1956, Parker presented the news with Pearce. Prior to this she had worked in England, where she became a well-known stage, screen and television actress."Everybody in England knew Mary Parker", said her husband, Paul Fitzgerald. "In England she did several films with Sir Douglas Fairbanks Jr – I've seen her name in lights on Shaftesbury Avenue and then she worked on TV as an announcer. They also brought her out to Australia in 1956 to open the (television coverage of the) Olympic Games – she was the first woman on television in (Melbourne)."

Personal life
Mary Parker was born on 31 October 1930 in Bitton, Gloucestershire. She grew up in Melbourne and attended Genazzano Convent school, returning to England to pursue her career until invited back to Melbourne by HSV-7 to be their initial female television personality.

Family
She married noted portrait artist Paul Fitzgerald in 1957. They have seven children: Fabian (born 1959), Marisa (born 1960), Patrick (born 1963; now  deceased), Emma (born 1964), Edward (born 1968), Maria (born 1970) and Frances (born 1973). She lives in Melbourne.

British film career
 The Vise (1955 TV series) (Kill Me My Love 1957, The Deception 1955, Gabriel's Choice 1954) ... Irene / Dorothy / Marianne Anderson (opposite Australian Ron Randell, Petula Clark, Honor Blackman and Patrick McGoohan)
(In Parker's profile in the 1956 British 'Who's Who on the Screen' annual, (page 121), The Vise's 'Deception' episode, (above), is listed as: "Triple Blackmail-the Deception".
 The Hostage (1956) ... Rosa Gonzuelo (lead female role opposite Ron Randell)
 Colonel March of Scotland Yard [TV series] (1956) (Present Tense 1957 ... Emily [opposite Boris Karloff])
 You Lucky People (1955) ...  Pvt. Sally Briggs (lead female role, opposite Tommy Trinder and Dora Bryan)
 Third Party Risk (1954) ... Nancy (opposite Lloyd Bridges and Finlay Currie)
 Douglas Fairbanks Presents [TV series] (The International Settlement 1954, The Trap 1954) ... Elizabeth / Peggy.

Australian television career
In the 1950s it was usual to have a host top and tail the various programs and Mary Parker had that role in the early days of HSV-7.

She also presented the following programs:
 Beauty is My Business 
 Eric and Mary (with Eric Pearce)
 Guest of the Week The Judy Jack Show (covered when the regular hostess was indisposed)

In an interview with Parker in May 2015, she explained that she was also one of the first pianists on HSV-7, playing as preludes to a couple of her regular series of interviews. She started an interview with Des Bradley (violinist) by accompanying him in a rendition of Saint Saëns's The Swan. Another interview was with Freddy Cole and started with a piano duet between Cole and Parker; this must have looked interesting to viewers because of the black and white hands on the keyboard.

Parker shares the honour of being among the first women on Australian television with Babs McKinnon the first woman on Sydney television when TCN-9 was opened on 16 September 1956. In Melbourne, on HSV-7's opening night, singer Toni Lamond appeared in a variety program.

See also
 Colonel March of Scotland Yard, British television program
 Douglas Fairbanks Presents, British television program
 You Lucky People, British movie
 Third Party Risk'', British movie

References

British women television presenters
English film actresses
English television actresses
1930 births
Living people
People from Bitton
Actresses from Melbourne
English emigrants to Australia
Australian television presenters
Australian women television presenters
Australian Roman Catholics
People educated at Genazzano FCJ College